The Pocahontas Fuel Company Store was a historic Pocahontas Fuel Company company store building located at Switchback, McDowell County, West Virginia.  It was designed by architect Alex B. Mahood, and built in 1917.  It was a two-story brick building with a one-story wing that housed the business office.  It had a flat roof, sat on a high stone foundation, and featured Neoclassical detailing.  It had a brick cornice with a concrete parapet and a concrete entablature with dentils.

It was listed on the National Register of Historic Places in 1992.

See also 
 Pocahontas Fuel Company Store (Jenkinjones, West Virginia)
 Pocahontas Fuel Company Store (Maybeury, West Virginia)

References

Alex B. Mahood buildings
Neoclassical architecture in West Virginia
Commercial buildings on the National Register of Historic Places in West Virginia
Commercial buildings completed in 1917
National Register of Historic Places in McDowell County, West Virginia
Company stores in the United States
U.S. Route 52